The giant white-eye, or Palau greater white-eye (Megazosterops palauensis) is a species of bird in the family Zosteropidae. It is monotypic within the genus Megazosterops. It is endemic to Palau, where its natural habitat is tropical moist lowland forest. The species is currently classified as Near Threatened by the IUCN due to likely habitat loss and the possibility of the establishment of the invasive brown tree snake on the island.

References

Zosteropidae
Birds of Palau
Endemic fauna of Palau
Endemic birds of Palau
Near threatened animals
Near threatened biota of Oceania
Birds described in 1915
Taxonomy articles created by Polbot